The women's heptathlon event at the 1982 Commonwealth Games was held on 3 and 4 October at the QE II Stadium in Brisbane, Australia. It was the first time this event was held at the Commonwealth Games, replacing the pentathlon.

Results

References

Day 1 results (The Sydney Morning Herald)
Day 2 results (The Sydney Morning Herald)
Day 1 results (The Canberra Times)
Day 2 results (The Canberra Times)
Australian results 

Athletics at the 1982 Commonwealth Games
1982